The Great J. J. Jackson is the second album released by J. J. Jackson. The album was released in 1969 on Warner Bros. Records.

History 
The album was released in 1969 by Warner Bros. Records, following the successful 1969 re-release by Warner Bros. of Jackson's 1966 hit single, "But It's Alright". Warner Bros. had acquired from Jackson's former record company, Calla Records, the rights to Jackson's first album, which included "But It's Alright". "But It's Alright" and four other songs from Jackson's first album were included on The Great J. J. Jackson. The balance of the album consisted of non-album singles released on Calla Records, plus A-sides and B-sides of singles Jackson had released in 1968 and 1969 on Loma Records, a Warner Bros. affiliate label, and Warner Bros. Records.

Reaction 
The music is regarded as being consistent across periods, with Jackson being described as "a man devoted to old-school soul", rather than following trends.

Critically described as "the definitive J. J. Jackson collection", in 2009 The Great J. J. Jackson was re-released, on CD, by Collector's Choice. The re-release included as additional tracks the remaining songs from Jackson's first album on Calla Records that had not been included in the original release of The Great J. J. Jackson.

Track listing

Additional tracks 
 "You've Got Me Dizzy" (Reed)
 "Come See Me (I'm Your Man)" (Jackson, Tubbs, Barnes)
 "The Stones I Throw" (Robertson)
 "Give Me Back the Love" (Paul, Green, King)
 "Ain't Too Proud To Beg"
 "Love Is a Hurtin' Thing"
 "Boogaloo Baby" (Lewis, Jackson)
 "Let It Out" (Barkan, Meltzer)

Credits

Original recording 
Produced by Lew Futterman
Arranged By J. J. Jackson
Art Direction by Ed Thrasher
Cover Illustration by David Willardson

2009 reissue 
Produced by Gordon Anderson
Mastered by Bob Fisher
Liner notes by Gene Sculatti

References 

1969 albums
J. J. Jackson (singer) albums